Bob Cooper (December 6, 1925 – August 5, 1993) was a West Coast jazz musician known primarily for playing tenor saxophone, but also for being one of the first to play jazz solos on oboe.

Career
Cooper worked in Stan Kenton's band starting in 1945 and married the band's singer, June Christy, two years later. The union produced a daughter, Shay Christy Cooper (September 1, 1954 – February 21, 2014), with the marriage lasting 44 years, until Christy's death in 1990.  His last studio recording was on Karrin Allyson's album Sweet Home Cookin' (1994) on which he played tenor saxophone.

Cooper died of a heart attack in Los Angeles, California, at the age of 67.  He was found in his car, which had pulled over to the side of the road.

Selected discography

As leader
 The Bob Cooper Sextet (Capitol, 1954)
 Shifting Winds (Capitol, 1955)
 Flute 'n Oboe (Pacific Jazz, 1957) with Bud Shank
 Milano Blues (Music, 1957) 
 Coop! The Music of Bob Cooper (Contemporary, 1958)
 The Swing's to TV (World Pacific, 1958) with Bud Shank
 Blowin' Country (World Pacific, 1959) with Bud Shank
 Tenor Sax Jazz Impressions (Trend, 1979)
 The Music of Michel Legrand (Discovery, 1980)
 In a Mellotone (Contemporary, 1985) with the Snooky Young Sextet featuring Ernie Andrews
 At The Royal Palms Inn (Woofy Productions, 1993) with Carl Fontana

As sideman
With Chet Baker
 Witch Doctor (Contemporary, 1953 [1985])
With Elmer Bernstein
 The Man with the Golden Arm (Decca, 1956)
With Buddy Bregman
 Swinging Kicks (Verve, 1957)
With June Christy
 Do-Re-Mi (Capitol, 1961)
With Maynard Ferguson
 Maynard Ferguson's Hollywood Party (EmArcy, 1954)
 Jam Session featuring Maynard Ferguson (EmArcy, 1954)
 Dimensions (EmArcy, 1955)
With Jimmy Giuffre
 The Jimmy Giuffre Clarinet (Atlantic, 1956)
With Stan Kenton
 Stan Kenton's Milestones (Capitol, 1943-47 [1950])
 Stan Kenton Classics (Capitol, 1944-47 [1952])
 Artistry in Rhythm (Capitol, 1946)
 Encores (Capitol, 1947)
 A Presentation of Progressive Jazz (Capitol, 1947)
 Innovations in Modern Music (Capitol, 1950)
 Stan Kenton Presents (Capitol, 1950)
 City of Glass (Capitol, 1951)
 Popular Favorites by Stan Kenton (Capitol, 1953)
 This Modern World (Capitol, 1953)
 The Kenton Era (Capitol, 1940–54, [1955])
 The Innovations Orchestra (Capitol, 1950-51 [1997])
 Stan Kenton Conducts the Los Angeles Neophonic Orchestra (Capitol, 1965)
 Hair (Capitol, 1969)
With Barney Kessel
 Kessel Plays Standards (Contemporary, 1954–55)
With Shelly Manne
 The West Coast Sound (Contemporary, 1955)
With Jack Nitzsche
 Heart Beat (Soundtrack) (Capitol, 1980)
With Art Pepper
 Showcase for Modern Jazz (Brunswick, 1958)
With Shorty Rogers
 Cool and Crazy (RCA Victor, 1953)
 Shorty Rogers Courts the Count (RCA Victor, 1954)
 Collaboration (RCA Victor, 1954) with André Previn
 Afro-Cuban Influence (RCA Victor, 1958)
 Shorty Rogers Meets Tarzan (MGM, 1960)
With Pete Rugolo
 Introducing Pete Rugolo (Columbia, 1954)
 Adventures in Rhythm (Columbia, 1954)
 Rugolomania (Columbia, 1955)
 New Sounds by Pete Rugolo (Harmony, 1954–55, [1957])
 Out on a Limb (EmArcy, 1956)
 An Adventure in Sound: Reeds in Hi-Fi (Mercury, 1956 [1958])
 Rugolo Plays Kenton (EmArcy, 1958)
 The Music from Richard Diamond (EmArcy, 1959)
 The Original Music of Thriller (Time, 1961)
 10 Saxophones and 2 Basses (Mercury, 1961)
With Bud Shank
 Jazz at Cal-Tech (Pacific Jazz, 1956)
 Barefoot Adventure (Pacific Jazz, 1961)
 Bud Shank & the Sax Section (Pacific Jazz, 1966)

References

External links

 
 

American jazz oboists
American male jazz musicians
Male oboists
American jazz tenor saxophonists
American male saxophonists
Cool jazz oboists
Cool jazz saxophonists
Hard bop oboists
Hard bop saxophonists
West Coast jazz oboists
West Coast jazz saxophonists
Jazz musicians from California
Musicians from Pittsburgh
1925 births
1993 deaths
20th-century American saxophonists
American music arrangers
Jazz musicians from Pennsylvania
20th-century American male musicians
The Capp-Pierce Juggernaut members